Purdum is an unincorporated community in northwestern Blaine County, Nebraska, United States.  It lies along local roads northwest of the village of Brewster, the county seat of Blaine County.  Its elevation is 2,700 feet (823 m).  Although Purdum is unincorporated, it has a post office, with the ZIP code of 69157.  The town is also home to the Purdum State Bank, and a half-dozen small businesses, a church,
and a fire station.  In the immediate environs are several livestock ranches.

History
Purdum was named for John Purdum, a pioneer settler.

References

Unincorporated communities in Blaine County, Nebraska
Unincorporated communities in Nebraska